This is a list of Maldivian films scheduled to be released in 2021.

Releases

Feature film

Short film

Television

See also
 List of Maldivian films of 2020
 Lists of Maldivian films
 List of Maldivian films of 2022

References 

Maldivian
2021